John Thomas Malokas (August 1, 1916 – April 16, 2000) was an American professional basketball player. He played in the National Basketball League for the Cleveland Allmen Transfers and averaged 1.0 points per game. He also played for the Cleveland Chase Brassmen when they were an independent traveling team, as well as the Cleveland Rosenblums as members in the American Basketball League.

References

1916 births
2000 deaths
American men's basketball players
Baseball players from Cleveland
Basketball players from Cleveland
Cleveland Allmen Transfers players

Cleveland Rosenblums players
Guards (basketball)
Ohio Bobcats baseball players
Ohio Bobcats men's basketball players